Kenny Irons (born September 15, 1983) is a former American football running back. He was drafted by the Cincinnati Bengals in the second round of the 2007 NFL Draft. He played college football at Auburn.

He is the brother of former Atlanta Falcons cornerback David Irons.

Early years
At Dacula High School in Dacula, Georgia, Irons rushed for 1985 yards and 19 touchdowns, playing alongside his brother David.  His high school honors included PrepStar All-American, Sporting News Top 25,  Atlanta Journal-Constitution's Top 11, Gwinnett County Back of the Year, and playing in the Georgia-Florida High School All-Star Game.  Irons initially signed with the University of South Carolina to play for then-head coach Lou Holtz.  He is the nephew of Gerald Irons and Leroy Jackson and he is the cousin of Grant Irons, Jarrett Irons and Paul Irons. Prior to his success toting the rock on the gridiron, Kenny's passion in his formative years was cascading through the skies in a hot air balloon with his father, Gerald. Kenny became the youngest balloon pilot in New Jersey history to complete a transcontinental voyage in 1992, when at the age of 9 he trekked alone from his home state to Palo Alto, California, isolated in the basket of his airborne vehicle he named "Tabitha." Kenny eventually drifted away from his passion of skyward transportation at the age of 13 when he broke the Garden State Pop Warner league record for single season rush yards with 6,969 in his final campaign before wreaking havoc in the high school ranks.

College career

South Carolina
Irons lettered as a true freshman at University of South Carolina after appearing in nine games with one start. For the season, he rushed for 201 yards on 47 carries.  He also had four pass receptions for 63 yards and one touchdown on a 30-yard catch and run against Mississippi State. He rushed for a season high 43 yards on 12 attempts against Mississippi State.

Auburn
Irons transferred to Auburn University following the 2003 season in order to play alongside his brother again.  Kenny participated in the Auburn A-Day Spring Game, but was ineligible to play the following year due to NCAA regulations.  While sitting out the 2004 season, Irons was able to apprentice under future NFL players Cadillac Williams and Ronnie Brown.

Even though he was not allowed to play on Saturdays, Kenny Irons was an important part of the team that fall.  As a member of the Scout Team, or practice squad, he simulated opposing teams' running backs, enabling the defense to get an accurate look at what the opposing runner would be like.  Some have credited his dedication to that role as an important factor in the Auburn Tigers' undefeated 2004 season.

During spring practice, Irons received the Off-Season Conditioning Award from the coaching staff.  Although he was lauded as the heir apparent to the starting running back role, freshman sensation Brad Lester and undersized, but experienced veteran Tre Smith provided Irons with plenty of competition.

Irons entered the season as the backup running back after criticism that he could not pick up blocks well enough to function as a complete running back in Al Borges's complex offensive scheme.  Garnering only one carry for six yards, Irons' opening game as a Tiger was a disappointment.  The following week, still as the backup, he had 13 carries against a very tough Mississippi State defense and rushed for only 28 yards.  In the next two weeks against non-conference foes Ball State and Western Kentucky, Irons rushed for 258 yards on 29 carries and seemed to be finding his stride.  He made his third straight start the following week against his former team, South Carolina.

Going into the week, there was a great deal of hype regarding Irons' playing against his former team although Lou Holtz was no longer the coach, having been replaced by Steve Spurrier. Despite two touchdowns, his performance was otherwise lackluster, gaining only 27 yards on 11 carries.  Irons was replaced as a starter for the following week by Brad Lester.

The game against the Arkansas Razorbacks in Fayetteville proved to be a turning point in Irons' career. Lester entered the game as the starter, but suffered an injury early in the game.  Substituting for the injured starter, Kenny carried the ball 33 times for 182 yards.  After that performance, Irons started at running back for the rest of the season.

On October 22, 2005, Auburn traveled to Baton Rouge, Louisiana to play the highly ranked LSU Tigers.  While getting off of the bus at the stadium, Irons gestured to the ESPN crew that he would rush for 200 yards that night.  The game was a classic, with Irons establishing himself as a punishing North-South runner.  He ended the contest with 218 yards and one touchdown in an overtime loss to the Tigers.

Through the rest of the regular season Irons maintained his aggressive, punishing running style and gained over 100 yards rushing in each of his remaining games.  He was twice selected SEC Offensive Player of the Week, first following his performance against the Georgia Bulldogs and then again against the Arkansas Razorbacks.  For the season he had gained 1293 yards and 13 touchdowns on 256 carries.  His 2005 rushing total was the 6th best in Auburn history, placing Irons behind greats like Bo Jackson, Cadillac Williams, and future Cincinnati Bengal teammate, Rudi Johnson.  At season's end Irons was a unanimous selection for both the Coaches' All-SEC First-team and the Associated Press All-SEC First-team.

The 2006 season was entered with much anticipation.  Irons had been held out of the A-Day Spring game to avoid unnecessary injury.  Speculations for his senior year included him rushing for 1,500 yards, and he was considered as a candidate for the Doak Walker, Maxwell and even Heisman Trophy Awards.

The first game of the year was against Washington State University and the highly regarded defense of Bill Doba, featuring Mkristo Bruce.  Irons torched the Cougars for 183 yards on 20 carries and one touchdown, in a 40-14 Tiger victory.  Soon after that game, Kenny suffered from a broken index finger that prevented him from planting his hand over the ball.  Some say that Irons should have sat out until he was full speed, but instead, he played through the injury.

Over the next two games, Irons was held under 100 yards per contest.  He was given an off week against the University of Buffalo to allow him a  chance to recover.  Irons returned to the field the following week for the road trip to Columbia, South Carolina to confront the team and fans that he felt turned their back on him three years earlier.  The game was a hard fought contest.  A surprise onside kick allowed Auburn to maintain control of the ball for the entire 3rd quarter.  The game ended in a Tigers victory, with Kenny gaining 117 yards and 2 touchdowns.

Though his senior campaign was at times impressive, the injuries he suffered severely hampered his efforts and he fell short of his hoped for production.  For the season, he had rushed 198 times for a total of 941 yards and 4 touchdowns, while leading the Tigers to an 11-2 season record.  Perhaps more importantly Irons graduated from Auburn University with a degree in economics.

Career statistics

Professional career

Pre-draft
Following the completion of his senior football season, Irons recovered from his injuries and began to work out and prepare for the 2007 NFL Draft. He and his brother signed with the same agent and worked out together. They traveled together to the Senior Bowl, NFL Combine, and their individual pro days. At the combine, Irons posted a 4.45 second 40-yard dash time and a 38-inch vertical leap.

Cincinnati Bengals
Irons was selected by the Cincinnati Bengals in the second round (49th overall) of the 2007 NFL Draft.

During the second quarter of the Bengals first preseason game against the Detroit Lions on August 9, Irons tore his ACL on his fourth carry of the game, ending his rookie season. Irons was expected to recover fully and be ready for spring workouts. After the conclusion of the 2007 regular season, Irons said he expected to be ready for training camp in July 2008. However, on July 25, Irons was waived/injured by the Bengals and subsequently placed the reserve/physically-unable-to-perform list. He was waived from the PUP list on August 4.

References

External links
 Auburn Tigers bio
 Cincinnati Bengals bio

1983 births
Living people
People from Dacula, Georgia
Players of American football from Camden, New Jersey
Sportspeople from the Atlanta metropolitan area
Players of American football from Georgia (U.S. state)
African-American players of American football
American football running backs
South Carolina Gamecocks football players
Auburn Tigers football players
Cincinnati Bengals players
21st-century African-American sportspeople
20th-century African-American people
Irons family (American football)